Sujan Chakraborty (born 16 March 1959) is an Indian Communist politician and member of Communist Party of India (Marxist). He was the MLA of Jadavpur (Vidhan Sabha constituency) from 2016 to 2021. In the 2016 West Bengal Assembly elections, he defeated his nearest rival, Minister for Power in the Government of West Bengal, Manish Gupta of the Trinamool Congress. In 2021 he was defeated by Moloy Majumdar of AITC by a margin of 38869 votes. He was a member of the 14th Lok Sabha representing Jadavpur constituency in West Bengal state.

Chakraborty was the editor of Chhatra Sangram (Students' Struggle), the Bengali organ of the state unit of the Students Federation of India from 1986 to 1988. He was the secretary of the state unit of the organization from 1988 to 1993 and general secretary of its central body from 1993 to 1994. From 1996 to 2000 Chakraborty was a member of the state unit of the Centre of Indian Trade Unions. Later, he became a member of the General Council of the Centre of Indian Trade Unions. Member, (i) Indian Science Congress Association; (ii) Indian Pharmaceutical Association, (iii) Pharmacy Council of India, and (iv) West Bengal State Council of Technical Education; Written several articles on student movement, political and contemporary issues; presented research papers in various International Scientific Conferences in India and abroad. West Bengal State Committee (1988–93),West Bengal Pharmaceutical & Photochemical Development Corporation Ltd., 1996–2001;  Infusion India Ltd., 1998–1999; West Bengal Rural Energy Development Corporation Ltd., 1999–2004.

References

External links

 Sujan Chakraborty Profile

Living people
1959 births
Communist Party of India (Marxist) politicians from West Bengal
People from South 24 Parganas district
India MPs 2004–2009
Jadavpur University alumni
Lok Sabha members from West Bengal
Communist Party of India (Marxist) candidates in the 2014 Indian general election
West Bengal MLAs 2016–2021
Deputy opposition leaders